John Felton may refer to:

John Felton (assassin) (c. 1595–1628), assassin of George Villiers, 1st Duke of Buckingham
John Felton (martyr) (died 1570), English Catholic martyr
John Felton (divine), English academic and churchman
John Felton (canoeist) (born 1960), Australian slalom canoeist
John Felton (died 1396) (c. 1339–1396), in 1390, Member of Parliament for Northumberland
John Felton (c. 1537–c. 1602), Member of Parliament for Great Yarmouth
John Felton (American football) (1883–1961), American football coach
John B. Felton (1827–1877), American jurist and politician